The former princely state of Swat (1926-1969) is known for its buildings, roads and architecture. These buildings show the quality and architectural design of that time.  These buildings serve as benchmarks of architecture, style and stability. A brief description of some of these buildings and structures is given below:

List
 Wadudia Hall
 White Palace
 Royal Palace Saidu Sharif
 Palace of the last Wāli of Swat
 Tomb of Akhund of Swat
 Saidu Baba Mosque
 Mausoleum of Badshah Sahib
 The Central Hospital, Swat
 Saidu Hospital
 Allah-o -Akbar Mosque
 Wadudia High School Saidu Sharif
 Serena Hotel, Swat
 Jahanzeb College
 Swat Museum

See also 
Swat District
Swat (princely state)
White Palace (Marghazar)

References

Further reading
 Sultan-i-Rome (2008). Swat State (1915-1969) from Genesis to Merger: An Analysis of Political, Administrative, Socio-political, and Economic Development

Buildings and structures in Khyber Pakhtunkhwa
Swat District